René Paul Émile Pourrière ( ? – 13 January 1945) was a 20th-century French playwright and chansonnier.

Works 

1908: La Marocaine !, chansonnette militaire, music by F. Vargues
1909: Le Front des mamans, music by Odette Vargues
1909: Réponse à Pierrot, music by O. Vargues
1909: Les trois Billets, music by O. Vargues
1909: Vive l'été, music by F. Vargues
1910: La Toquette, with Alexandre Trébitsch, music by Félicien Vargues
1910: Ah ! Mireille !, music by F. Vargues
1910: Le Cœur de Mimi, song, music by F. Vargues
1910: Fin d'amour, music by Odette Vargues
1910: Le Rêve du gondolier, music by O. Vargues
1911: Le joli Modèle, with Maurice Duval, music by F. Vargues
1911: Miarka !, song, music by F. Vargues
1912: Un sou d'plaisir, song, music by Fernand Heintz
1912: Carolina, music by F. Vargues
1912: La Dame et le jeune homme, music by F. Vargues
1912: Frans, le sonneur, music by F. Vargues
1912: La Promise, chanson bretonne, music by Mario
1912: La Retraite passe, chanson-marche, music by F. Vargues
1913: Mam'zelle Lilas, music by F. Vargues
1913: J'aime tes yeux, music by O. Vargues
1913: Les Jaloux sont de grands enfants !, valse, music by Edmond Nikelmann
1913: Le joli Tour, sérénade vénitienne, music by Alcib Mario
1913: La Petite blanchisseuse, chansonnette blanche, music by Jardin
1913: Tango d'amour, tango, music by Nikelmann
1913: Une Vie de noceur, valse, music by Nikelmann
1914: C'est aimable à vous !, diction, music by Léon Terret
1914: La Femme à tout le monde. Béguin de fille, valse, music by Raoul Soler
1914: Ce n'est que l'Amour !, chansonnette, music by Terret
1914: En 1807, retour de la Grande armée, music by Charles Beckand
1914: Le Président de la République, chanson humoristique, music by Alcib Mario
1914: Tristan, le jeune homme triste, music by Émile Spencer
1914: Y'a bon !, chanson soudanaise, music by Jardin
1914: La gavotte du sébasto, gavotte moderne, music by Antonin Jouberti
1917: Gaspard à Paris, revue d'un permissionnaire en 2 acts and 6 tableaux, with Henri Blondeau
1924: Moi, je n'aime pas ça !, chansonnette, music by Vincent Scotto
1924: Les Affaires sont les affaires, with Paul Diolot, music by Vincent Puget
1942: Ça plaît aux femmes, music by Alcib Mario
1942: En écoutant la garde, with Henri Muller, music by Charles Jardin
1942: J'ai retrouvé, music by Gaston Gabaroche
1942: Un soir à Bénarès, mélodie fox trot
1942: Papillon du soir, music by René de Buxeuil

20th-century French dramatists and playwrights
French chansonniers
Year of birth missing
1945 deaths